MM Murugappan is a fourth-generation member of the Murugappa family and the Executive Chairman of the Murugappa Group Corporate Advisory Board since Feb 2018. He is Chairman of Tube Investments of India Ltd, Carborundum Universal Ltd and Coromandel International Ltd. He is a Trustee of the AMM Foundation and the Correspondent of the Murugappa Polytechnic College. He is also on the board of Mahindra & Mahindra Ltd, Cyient Ltd and IIT Madras-Research Park.

He has a Bachelor’s in Chemical Engineering from the AC College of Technology, University of Madras, and a Master of Science Degree in Chemical Engineering from the University of Michigan, United States. He is a member of the American and Indian Institutes of Chemical Engineers, the Indian Ceramic Society and the Plastics and Rubber Institute.He was awarded the Lifetime Achievement award at TiECON Chennai 2022.

References

Living people
Year of birth missing (living people)
Indian billionaires
University of Michigan College of Engineering alumni
Murugappa family